Selvam Veerasingam (born 8 November 1969), known as V. Selvam, is a Malaysian former professional tennis player. He now coaches and runs the DUTA International Tennis Academy in Kuala Lumpur.

Debuting in 1988, Selvan had a record 14-year Davis Cup career for Malaysia. He featured in a total of 35 ties, for 24 singles and 13 doubles wins. In addition to the Davis Cup he also represented his country in multiple editions of the Southeast Asian Games and won three bronze medals, two of which came in singles.

Selvam, who was trained by Nick Bollettieri, holds the highest ATP singles ranking for a Malaysian player, reaching 424 in the world in 1994. He made an ATP Tour main draw appearance at the 1995 Kuala Lumpur Open, where he lost his first round match in three sets to Paul Wekesa.

References

External links
 
 
 

1969 births
Living people
Malaysian male tennis players
Southeast Asian Games medalists in tennis
Southeast Asian Games bronze medalists for Malaysia
Competitors at the 1989 Southeast Asian Games
Competitors at the 2001 Southeast Asian Games
20th-century Malaysian people
21st-century Malaysian people